Events in the year 1860 in Mexico.

Incumbents
President:
Interior Secretary (SEGOB):

Governors
 Aguascalientes: Esteban Ávila Mier
 Campeche: 
 Chiapas: Matías Castellanos/Ángel Albino Corzo
 Chihuahua: 
 Coahuila: Santiago Vidaurri
 Colima: Jerónimo Calatayud/Urbano Gómez
 Durango:  
 Guanajuato: 
 Guerrero: 
 Jalisco: Pedro Espejo/Pedro Valadez/Severo Castillo/Pedro Ogazón
 State of Mexico:  
 Michoacán: 
 Nuevo León: Santiago Vidaurri
 Oaxaca: 
 Puebla: 
 Querétaro: Zeferino Macías
 San Luis Potosí: 
 Sinaloa: 
 Sonora: 
 Tabasco: 
 Tamaulipas: Santiago Vidaurr	 
 Veracruz: Manuel Gutiérrez Zamora
 Yucatán: 
 Zacatecas:

Events
March 6 – Reform War: Battle of Anton Lizardo

Births

Deaths

References

 
Years of the 19th century in Mexico